The 10th U-boat Flotilla (German 10. Unterseebootsflottille) was a German U-boat flotilla used for front-line combat purposes during World War II. Founded on 15 January 1942 at Lorient under the command of Korvettenkapitän Günther Kuhnke, eighty U-boats operated with this flotilla before it was dissolved on 21 August 1944, and the remaining U-boats were moved to bases in Norway and Germany.

U-boats assigned 

 
 
 
 
 
 
 
 
 
 
 
 
 
 
 
 
 
 
 
 
 
 
 
 
 
 
 
 
 
 
 
 
 
 
 
 
 
 
 
 
 
 
 
 
 
 
 
 
 
 
 
 
 
 
 
 
 
 
 
 
 
 
 
 
 
 
 
 
 
 
 
 
 
 
 
 
 
 

References 

10
Military units and formations of the Kriegsmarine
Military units and formations established in 1942
Military units and formations disestablished in 1944
1942 establishments in Germany